The Journal of Experimental Child Psychology is a monthly peer-reviewed academic journal covering experimental child psychology. It was established in 1964 and is published by Elsevier (formerly Academic Press). The editor-in-chief is David F. Bjorklund (Florida Atlantic University). According to the Journal Citation Reports, the journal has a 2017 impact factor of 2.424.

References

External links

Experimental psychology journals
Elsevier academic journals
Publications established in 1964
Monthly journals
English-language journals
Developmental psychology journals